The Momogun Rungus are an ethnic group of Borneo, residing primarily in northern Sabah in the area surrounding Kudat Peninsular, Kota Marudu, Pitas Bengkoka Peninsular and Beluran. A sub-group of the Dayak, they have a distinctive language, dress, architecture, customs, and oral literature.

Subsistence
As with most indigenous ethnic groups in Borneo, culture revolves around rice; however, coconut and banana groves provide cash income. Women weave cloth on backstrap looms, and make containers from vine or beadwork. Many Rungus now work in town, and have abandoned the communal life of the longhouse for modern Malaysian society. 

Momogun Rungus has a very antique traditional writing which is one of the forms of writing hieroglyphs or called Surip in the Rungus language. 

Traditionally having a belief called the agama Labus or Labus religion, although some writers label it aninism, with male priests called Rampahan and female priestess called Bobolizan, most Rungus are now Christian. Most Rungus attended the Protestant Church of Sabah (PCS) and is mainly in the Bahasa Malaysia congregation.

Longhouses

Considered one of the most traditional ethnic groups in Sabah, many Momogun Rungus live in longhouses, with each family having its own separate quarters off a common hall. At the edge of the communal hall, a well-ventilated platform of split bamboo with outward sloping walls provides a place for socialising and communal work. The Rungus longhouse is quite different from the Murut longhouse. The houses are not perched on high stilts, but are usually only three to five feet above ground. The roof is low, and the walls are outward sloped. In olden times, longhouses of over 75 doors are said to have been common. Now, they rarely exceed 10 doors. Usually single story, more modern two-story versions of the longhouse also exist. Single-family houses are sometimes built near the longhouse – these take the same form, but are curiously short, looking like a slice from a cake.

Dress
The traditional Rungus dress is black in colour, often with hundreds or even thousands of dollars worth of antique beads. Traditionally all of the Rungus women wore heavy brass coils around their arms, legs and necks. Brass arm coils are often accompanied by white and coral shell bracelets. Rings of brass may also be worn around the waist.

Beadwork
This beadwork and its designs easily distinguish the Rungus from the other ethnic groups of Sabah. "The beadwork often tells a story and this one in particular tells of a man going spear-hunting for a riverine creature". The pinakol consists of a pair of flat beaded bandoleer-type belts worn crossed over the chest and back.

The sandang is a pair of long beaded strands, mostly with matching beads. These are worn crossed over the chest like the pinakol.
The sullau is a flat beaded choker worn around the neck with two clamshell discs, one in front and one in back. Small bells are attached in the front. They make the discs out of plastic nowaday The tinggot is a short choker, either single beaded or with narrow beadwork. Men and women wear these.
The togkul is a necklace some 26 inches (66 cm) long with beads similar to the sandang but smaller and worn around the neck.
The sisingal is a narrow beaded band worn around the head.
The rampai is made of cotton, flowers and beads worked into the hair.
The orot. "Little brass rings and antique beads looped through thin strands of stripped bark (togung) becomes a wide and colorful hipband. To wear this the orot is slowly and carefully coiled around the hip. Then a last string of beads (Llobokon) is hung loosely from the coil. The orot is hand made by the Rungus men as the technique is known only to them".

The bobolizan originates with the Tuaran Lotud group of Sabah, but according to Rose Sabala sometimes Rungus wear bobolizan to talk to spirits in the old language.

There are also sad'ang, earrings that sometimes have beads attached.

Many of the beads used by the Rungus are plastic and glass imitations of older heirloom beads. Materials such as plastic spoons were heated over a flame and the hot plastic are then winded onto a metal rod to make yellow beads.

Cuisine

Rungus cuisine is mainly prepared using cooking methods like braising, grilling and baking. Being a community of fishermen and farmers, the staple foods of the Rungus people usually consists of rice and cassava, supplemented with green vegetables and fish.

Tinunuvan soguntung is the Rungus term for a preparation of grilled or roasted eggplant. The cooked eggplant is peeled, and served with chillies, lime juice, toasted ikan bilis or salted fish, and sprigs of lompodos (a local variety of basil).

Tinonggilan is a slightly sparkling alcoholic drink made from maize. Akin to the Latin American corn beer, Tinonggilan is a Rungus speciality and is usually served during festive occasions, or as refreshments for guests during the performance of a ritual dance called Mongigol Sumundai.

The Rungus also prepare simple sweet foods such as flatbread made from sweetened grated cassava (tinopis runti) and bintanok dalai, or mashed corn wrapped and steamed in corn husks. These are to be consumed for breakfast or as snacks.

Festival
Magahau is the main festival of the Rungus ethnic group. Magahau is a festival of ancient Rungus tradition associated with the celebration of the new year according to the traditional calendar of Rungus.

Like the Kadazan-Dusun ethnic, Rungus ethnic people also celebrate Kaamatan. Kaamatan is part of Magahau in Rungus Festival. Kaamatan is just one of the many festive entities during Magahau.

This festival is usually celebrated on 31 May every year. Even though there are many similarities the way of celebration between this two race but there is also comparison.

Among the current major entities of Magahau are:

1. Moginum

2. Mangantag

3. Mangatod

4. Mogontong

5. Moginakan

6. Lumuvas

7. Kaamatan (Mongolosod)

8. Mabbaris (Sumazau)

9. Manaradan

10. and more

Notable People
 Datuk Wetrom Bahanda - Sabah state minister.
 Datuk Julita Majungki - Sabah assistant state minister.

References

External links

 Rungus Dusun, Encyclopedia of World Cultures Supplement, Appell, George, 2002
 The Kastum family of Kudat, Sabah
 Dr Felix Akiam (2015). Inventori Budaya Etnik Negeri Sabah - Etnik Momogun Rungus (Terbitan Lembaga Kebudayaan Negeri Sabah)

Kadazan-Dusun people
Ethnic groups in Indonesia
Ethnic groups in Sabah